Athesis clearista is a species of butterfly of the family Nymphalidae. It is found in Venezuela and Colombia.

Subspecies
Athesis clearista clearista (northern Venezuela)
Athesis clearista colombiensis Kaye, 1918 (Colombia)

References

Ithomiini
Nymphalidae of South America
Butterflies described in 1847